Łukasz Kubot and Marcelo Melo were the defending champions, but lost to Mate Pavić and Bruno Soares in the final, 4–6, 2–6.

Seeds

Draw

Finals

Top half

Bottom half

References

External Links
 Main draw

Rolex Shanghai Masters
Doubles